Arthur Annesley, 1st Earl of Mountnorris FRS (7 August 1744 – 4 July 1816) was an Irish peer.

He was the son of Richard Annesley, 6th Earl of Anglesey, and Juliana Donovan, Countess of Anglesey, who belonged to the junior sept of the O'Donovans of Clan Loughlin, the Donovans of Ballymore in County Wexford. She was initially rumoured to be of lower birth, the ancient pedigrees of some Irish families not being widely known in the English-speaking world at that time, and hers deriving from a remote region of Ireland, the Barony of Carbery. Countess Juliana was the great-great-great-granddaughter of Donel Oge na Cartan O'Donovan, the 1st Lord of Clan Loughlin to hold his territories from the Crown, from 1616 (see surrender and regrant).

He succeeded to the title of 6th Baron Altham, of Altham, in County Cork, and to the title of 8th Viscount Valentia upon his father's death on 14 February 1761.

On 22 April 1771, the House of Lords decided that his claim to his father's English titles was not valid, and that therefore these titles had become extinct on his father's death in 1761. He was created 1st Earl of Mountnorris [Ireland] on 3 December 1793.

Family
He married firstly Lucy Lyttelton, daughter of George Lyttelton, 1st Baron Lyttelton of Frankley, and Lucy Fortescue, on 10 May 1767. They had, among other children:
 
George Annesley, 2nd Earl of Mountnorris (2 November 1769 – 23 July 1844)
Juliana Lucy Annesley (born 1772), the eldest daughter and fourth child, who married in 1789 John Maxwell, later using the surname Barry. She was known as Lady Lucy Barry.

He next married Sarah Cavendish, daughter of Sir Henry Cavendish, 2nd Baronet, and Sarah Cavendish, 1st Baroness Waterpark, on 20 December 1783. They had, among other children:

Lady Frances Webster (1793-1837), married James Wedderburn-Webster and had issue. She was notorious for her supposed love affairs with famous men such as Lord Byron and the Duke of Wellington, even if these may only have been flirtations.
Catherine Annesley  (? – 25 June 1865) – married John Thomas Somerset, a younger son of Henry Somerset, 5th Duke of Beaufort, and had issue.

References

External links

|-

|-

Fellows of the Royal Society
1744 births
1816 deaths
Members of the Privy Council of Ireland
Arthur
1